Galina Gayda (born 28 February 1936) is a Russian sprinter. She competed in the women's 100 metres at the 1964 Summer Olympics.

References

1936 births
Living people
Athletes (track and field) at the 1964 Summer Olympics
Russian female sprinters
Olympic athletes of the Soviet Union
Place of birth missing (living people)
Soviet female sprinters
Olympic female sprinters